The Tepee is a historic commercial building and roadside attraction located near Cherry Valley in Otsego County, New York, United States.  It was built in 1954, and is a wood-frame structure sheathed in galvanized steel on a concrete foundation.  It measures 50 feet tall and 42 feet in diameter. It has four levels. Attached to the tepee is an "L"-shaped wood-frame building with a cross-gable roof.  The building houses a gift shop and food stand.

It was listed on the National Register of Historic Places in 2011.

References

Roadside attractions in New York (state)
Commercial buildings on the National Register of Historic Places in New York (state)
Commercial buildings completed in 1954
Buildings and structures in Otsego County, New York
National Register of Historic Places in Otsego County, New York
Tipis